Snohomish is a city in Snohomish County, Washington, United States. The population was 9,098 at the 2010 census. It is located on the Snohomish River, southeast of Everett and northwest of Monroe. Snohomish lies at the intersection of U.S. Route 2 and State Route 9. The city's airport, Harvey Airfield, is located south of downtown and used primarily for general aviation.

The city was founded in 1859 and named Cadyville after pioneer settler E. F. Cady and renamed to Snohomish in 1871. It served as county seat of Snohomish County from 1861 to 1897, when the county government was relocated to Everett. Snohomish has a downtown district that is renowned for its collection of antique shops and is listed on the National Register of Historic Places.

History

The Snohomish River Valley was originally inhabited by the Snohomish people, a Coast Salish tribe who lived between Port Gardner Bay and modern-day Monroe. An archaeological site near the confluence of the Snohomish and Pilchuck Rivers has indications of human habitation that began as early as 8,000 years before present. The Snohomish had contact with white explorers in the early 19th century, with their name recorded as "Sinnahamis" by John Work of the Hudson's Bay Company, among the first to also use the name to describe the river. The Snohomish were signatories of the Point Elliott Treaty in 1855, which relocated the tribe to the Tulalip Indian Reservation. In the early 1850s, the territorial government planned to construct a military road connecting Fort Steilacoom to Fort Bellingham, with a ferry crossing of the Snohomish River at Kwehtlamanish, a winter village of the Snohomish people. The road, proposed in the wake of the Pig War, was intended to be built far enough inland to be safe from British naval attacks.

The confluence of the Snohomish and Pilchuck rivers, located near Kwehtlamanish, was sought by several American settlers from Steilacoom who arrived in 1859 to file homestead claims. Edson F. Cady and Heil Barnes, representing carpenter Emory C. Ferguson, settled near the proposed ferry landing, while Egbert H. Tucker filed a claim for a plot on the other side of the Snohomish River. The settlement was originally known as "Cadyville" and changed its name to Snohomish City in 1871. The name Snohomish comes from the name of the dominant local Native American tribe "sdoh-doh-hohbsh", whose meaning is widely disputed.

Although the military road was never completed, Snohomish quickly became a center of commerce in the expanding region. In 1861, Snohomish County separated from Island County and the Village of Snohomish was voted the county seat. It remained so until 1897 when the county seat was relocated to the larger, yet much newer neighboring city of Everett, Washington after a controversial and contested county-wide vote.

Snohomish's first school was organized in either 1867 or 1869. The Village of Snohomish was incorporated in 1888 and re-incorporated as a city in 1890 due to the transition from territory to state. Hyrcanus Blackman was elected mayor, having already been Police Chief for two years. 1893 saw the construction of a roller skating rink and 1894 the first graduations from Snohomish High School. By 1899 the city of Snohomish was a prosperous town with a population of 2,000, 25 businesses and 80 homes.

1901 brought Snohomish the first motor car in the county. In 1903 First Street was paved with brick. When it was finished, there was a three-day celebration, and for years afterward, the city's residents remained so proud of the street that they washed it every week with a fire hose.

Emma C. Patric was appointed the town's first librarian in 1901, an event that lead to the 1910 grand opening of the town's first public library, The Carnegie Library. It is now the oldest remaining public building in the city. In 1911 a disastrous fire struck First Street and everything between Avenues B and C was destroyed. The fire began when a small blaze in the Palace Cafe on the South side of the street got out of control on Memorial Day, 1911 at about four a.m. Thirty-five business structures were put out of business, with $173,000 worth of goods destroyed. Despite the disaster the town continued to grow and by 1920 the population grew to a little over 3,000. The population would remain relatively stable for the next 40 years. The city was connected to Everett by an interurban railway that ceased operations in 1921 after a trestle was damaged during a major flood.

The Great Depression was not acutely felt in Snohomish due to its economy being mostly agrarian with many family farms. One of the town's largest employers, Bickford Ford, was founded in 1934 by Lawrence Bickford; the dealership flourished in a period when many auto dealerships failed. The 1930s brought Snohomish national notice as the hometown of baseball great Earl Averill, the first Washingtonian elected to the Baseball Hall of Fame. Averill played from 1929 to 1941, mostly with the Cleveland Indians.

The 1960s saw the city of Snohomish enter a period of decline. As the Boeing Company fell on hard times, many people were laid off and had to move away to seek other work. A commonly heard phrase was, "Will the last person out of Seattle please turn off the lights?" Snohomish fought back with a redevelopment plan in 1965 that proposed the destruction of the historic structures along First Street to make way for an enclosed mall. The plan was not carried out due to lack of funds, and the area remains today as it has through much of its history.

The town's economic malaise continued throughout much of the '70s, with the downtown area given over to mostly bars and small shops. In 1973 the city adopted a Historic District Ordinance protecting historic buildings and structures from inappropriate alterations and demolitions and encouraging the design of new construction in keeping with the district's historic character. In 1974, the Historic Business District, a 36-block area, was placed on the National Register of Historic Places. Larger stores moved away from First Street into newer developments and strip malls that spread out along Second Street and Avenue D.

In 1974 the Seattle-Snohomish mill was gutted by fire and rebuilt by its owners. In 1975 a severe flood struck the area, damaging over 300 homes and killing 3,500 head of livestock, but the community rallied to support those who were affected.

The 1980s saw renewed vigor in Snohomish when, along with other developments, two 7-Eleven convenience stores and a McDonald's franchise opened during the first part of the decade. Around 1985, the U.S. Route 2 bypass was completed, allowing traffic which had until then been forced to pass through the town to circumvent the city.

In the 1990s, First Street was redeveloped to take advantage of its historic buildings as a tourist attraction. Its sidewalks were rebuilt and public restrooms added. The city hall and police station were moved away from First Street and a new fire station was built, allowing those historic buildings to be renovated as well.

Geography

Snohomish is located along the north bank of the Snohomish River near where it is joined by the Pilchuck River. The city lies on the Getchell Hill Plateau, a low hill in the Snohomish River Valley that interrupts the wide, flat river valley. Some neighborhoods of the city are on a ridge that is west of the Pilchuck River, as well as Dutch Hill on the opposite bank. Blackmans Lake (formerly Stillaguamish Lake) is located north of downtown Snohomish and has a boat launch maintained by the city government. The river valley was formed approximately 14,000 years before present by the outflow of a glacial lake during the Vashon Glaciation event. The river itself floods during the winter season, occasionally breaching the dikes in Downtown Snohomish.

Snhoomish's city limits are generally defined by the Snohomish River to the south, Fobes Hill to the west, several city streets to the north, and the Pilchuck River to the east. The city also has an urban growth area that extends north towards U.S. Route 2 and south of the Snohomish River to include Harvey Airfield.

The historic business and residential center of the town constitutes the Snohomish Historic District, which is listed on the National Register of Historic Places. Many houses bear plaques with the year the house was built and the name of the people who originally occupied it. Each year the city gives tours of the historic houses; one of them, the Blackman House, is a year-round museum.

Demographics

2020 census

As of the 2020 U.S. census, there were 10,126 people, and 4,221 households in the city. The racial makeup of the city was 88.0% White, 0.4% African American, 0.5% Native American, 3.2% Asian, 0.2% Pacific Islander, and 6.7% from two or more races. Hispanic or Latino of any race were 5.6% of the population.

The median age in the city was 38.0 years. 22.5% of residents were under the age of 18; 5.5% were between the ages of 20 and 24; 28.6% were from 25 to 44; 25.0% were from 45 to 64; and 17.1% were 65 years of age or older. The gender makeup of the city was 45.5% male and 54.5% female.

The median income for a household in the city was $70,234. The per capita income for the city was $36,717. About 8.0% of the population was below the poverty line.

2010 census

As of the 2010 U.S. census, there were 9,098 people, 3,645 households, and 2,259 families residing in the city. The racial makeup of the city was 89.0% White, 0.5% African American, 1.1% Native American, 2.1% Asian, 0.3% Pacific Islander, 3.6% from other races, and 3.5% from two or more races. Hispanic or Latino of any race were 8.0% of the population.

There were 3,645 households, of which 34.8% had children under the age of 18 living with them, 40.5% were married couples living together, 15.4% had a female householder with no husband present, 6.1% had a male householder with no wife present, and 38.0% were non-families. 30.2% of all households were made up of individuals, and 9.8% had someone living alone who was 65 years of age or older. The average household size was 2.41 and the average family size was 2.99.

The median age in the city was 37.8 years. 24.3% of residents were under the age of 18; 8.4% were between the ages of 18 and 24; 27.7% were from 25 to 44; 27.9% were from 45 to 64; and 11.7% were 65 years of age or older. The gender makeup of the city was 48.2% male and 51.8% female.

Government and politics

Snohomish is a noncharter code city that has a strong mayor–council government, with an elected mayor and an elected city council. The seven part-time city councilmembers are elected at-large to four-year terms that are staggered, with odd years for elections. From 1971 to 2017, the city operated under a council–manager government that was switched after a vote in 2016 passed by a margin of 11 votes. Former city councilmember Linda Redmon was elected mayor in 2021 as part of a shift to more progressive officials.

The city government has 50 full-time employees and operated under a $22.7 million budget in 2016. It is led by the city administrator, an unelected position appointed by the mayor and confirmed by a city council vote. Heather Thomas has served in the role since 2022.

At the federal level, Snohomish is part of Washington's 1st congressional district, which has been represented by Democrat Suzan DelBene since 2012. At the state level, the city is part of the 44th legislative district along with Lake Stevens and Mill Creek. Snohomish is also wholly part of the Snohomish County Council's 5th district, which also includes all of the Skykomish Valley.

Parks and recreation

These include Ferguson Park and Hill Park on Blackmans Lake; Morgantown Park and Pilchuck Park on the Pilchuck River; and Cady Park and KlaHaYa Park in downtown on the Snohomish River. These parks include playgrounds, walking trails, picnic areas, boat launches, and sports fields. The city also owns the local Boys and Girls Club and senior center, leasing them out to their respective organizations. The Snohomish area is also home to several county parks and privately-owned recreational spaces that are primarily used for organized youth sports, such as soccer and baseball.

Snohomish is the southern terminus of the Centennial Trail, an intercity multi-use path for pedestrians, cyclists, and equestrians. It travels from the city through Lake Stevens and Arlington along a former railroad, terminating to the north at the Skagit County. The trail is maintained by the county government and is planned to be extended south from Snohomish to Woodinville, where it would connect with the Eastrail network. The Snohomish city government maintains its own network of multi-use paths, which range from gravel and unpaved trails along the Snohomish River to paved connections between downtown and Blackmans Lake.

The city is home to the Snohomish Aquatic Center, a public pool complex built by the Snohomish School District for its high school swim teams. It opened in 2014 at a cost of $22.2 million and was partially funded by the city government, which provides discounts for residents. The facility replaced the Hal Moe Pool, which originally opened in 1972 as an outdoor pool and covered in the 1989 by the school district. The pool was closed in 2007 and was demolished in 2018 to make way for a city park.

Education

The Snohomish School District operates public schools that serve residents of Snohomish and nearby unincorporated areas, including Cathcart, Machias, and Three Lakes. , the district has a total enrollment of 9,421 students, 488 teachers, and 18 total schools. It has two conventional high schools, Snohomish High School and Glacier Peak High School, and an alternative high school program. These high schools are fed by two middle schools, which in turn draw from ten elementary schools. The district is governed by a five-member school board and had a budget of $154 million for the 2020–21 school year.

The Snohomish area also has several private schools operated by churches and other organizations. The St. Michael Catholic Church founded its parish school in 2007, becoming the sixth in Snohomish County operated under the Archdiocese of Seattle. Other Christian schools include Lighthouse Christian Academy, the Academy of Snohomish, and Zion Lutheran School.

Culture

Arts

The city's largest performing arts venue is Tim Noah's Thumbnail Theater, a non-profit theater at the historic Church of Christ, Scientist. It was founded in 2003 and hosts theatrical performances, concerts, and improv comedy among other forms of entertainment.

Several films have been shot in Snohomish, including 1981 comedy-drama Bustin' Loose and the 1985 drama Twice in a Lifetime. The city's high school was also a setting in the 1983 film WarGames, which was primarily filmed in California.

Events

Snohomish hosts an annual summer festival called Kla Ha Ya Days, which attracts up to 25,000 visitors and began in 1913. It is one of several community events affiliated with the regional Seafair, held annually in July.

Media

The city is part of the Seattle–Tacoma media market and is served by a daily newspaper, The Everett Herald. A local weekly newspaper, the Snohomish County Tribune, is published in Snohomish.

Snohomish's public library is operated by Sno-Isle Libraries, a regional system that annexed the city-run library. Located near downtown, the  building is the third-largest in the Sno-Isle system and serves over 5,000 weekly patrons. It opened in July 2003 at a cost of $8 million, replacing an earlier Carnegie library building that was a third of the size. The Snohomish library was named one of the favorite libraries of book commentator and celebrity librarian Nancy Pearl in 2008.

The city was home to Snohomish County's first lending library, founded by local citizens in 1876. A permanent library building funded by Andrew Carnegie opened in 1910 and was expanded in 1968 with the construction of an annex that doubled its size. The building was determined to be too small to adequately meet Snohomish's needs in the 1990s, leading to proposals to build a second annex or replace it with a new building. The library building was converted into a temporary space for art exhibits following its closure in 2003 and was later used as a rentable community center. The building closed again in 2017 to undergo a $2.7 million renovation, which included demolition of the 1968 annex and restoration of an original crystal chandelier. It reopened in 2021.

Notable people
Snohomish has produced several professional athletes in American football, baseball, basketball, and ice hockey, including three baseball players named "Earl."

 Earl Averill, professional baseball player and Baseball Hall of Fame inductee
 Earl Averill Jr., professional baseball player
 Lexi Bender, professional ice hockey player
 Kyle Bjornethun, professional soccer player
 Jon Brockman, professional basketball player
 Tom Cable, American football offensive line coach and assistant head coach
 E. F. Cady, co-founder of Snohomish
 Adam Eaton, professional baseball player
 David Eddings, fantasy writer
 Emory C. Ferguson, county commissioner and co-founder of Snohomish

 Keith Gilbertson, professional American football player and coach
 Roy Grover, professional baseball player
 Larry Gunselman, NASCAR driver
 Kevin Hamlin, NASCAR driver
 Bret Ingalls, American football offensive line coach
 Curt Marsh, professional American football player
 Jesper Myrfors, card game art director and creative officer
 Jeff Ogden, professional American football player
 Jim Ollom, professional baseball player
 John Patric, author, journalist, and perennial candidate
 Don Poier, sports announcer
 Chris Reykdal, elected official and former state legislator
 Theodore Rinaldo, religious leader, businessman, and convicted child sex offender
 Doug Roulstone, Navy officer and state representative
 Chrissy Teigen, author and professional model
 Karen Thorndike, sailor and solo circumnavigator
 Earl Torgeson, county commissioner and professional baseball player
 Willis Tucker, journalist and county executive
 Josh Vanlandingham, professional basketball player
 Fred W. Vetter Jr., Air Force brigadier general
 Brooke Whitney, professional ice hockey player

Infrastructure

Transportation

Snohomish is bisected by two major highways: U.S. Route 2 (US 2), which bypasses the city to the north and east, continuing on to Everett and Stevens Pass; and State Route 9, which runs north–south and connects to Woodinville and Lake Stevens. Other major roads in Snohomish include Bickford Avenue (which continues south as Avenue D), which formerly carried US 2 and is named for a local car dealership, Machias Road (Maple Avenue), and 2nd Street (92nd Street).

Community Transit, the countywide public transit authority, provides bus, paratransit, and vanpool service to Snohomish from surrounding cities. Two routes travel from Everett Station (with limited service to the Boeing Everett Factory) to Snohomish and continue east along US 2 to Monroe, Sultan, and Gold Bar. Another route travels from Lynnwood and Mill Creek to Snohomish and follows the State Route 9 corridor north to Lake Stevens. Community Transit also operates a commuter bus route that connects Snohomish and Monroe to Downtown Seattle with intermediate stops on Interstate 405 and State Route 520. The city has one park and ride lot, located near Avenue D and State Route 9, that is owned by the Washington State Department of Transportation (WSDOT).

The city was formerly served by the Everett–Snohomish Interurban, an electric interurban railway that ceased operations in 1921. A small replica train depot was opened in 2005 near the Avenue D Bridge to serve as a visitors center.

A privately-owned airport, Harvey Airfield, is situated to the south of downtown Snohomish. It was established in 1944 and remains under the ownership of the Harvey family. The airport is generally used for general aviation and small businesses, including skydiving clubs and hot air balloon operators.

Utilities

Utility services for residents and businesses in Snohomish are split between the city government and other providers. The Snohomish County Public Utility District provides electric power to customers Snohomish and most of the county, while Puget Sound Energy supplies natural gas. The city government contracts with Republic Services for collection and disposal of curbside garbage, recycling, and yard waste. Since the closure of the Cathcart Landfill near Snohomish in 1992, garbage is generally sent to a landfill in Roosevelt for processing and burial.

The city government manages tap water service within Snohomish, which is delivered through a  system of pipes. The city purchases 90 percent of its water from the City of Everett, which sources from Spada Lake and the Sultan River basin; the remainder is purchased from the Snohomish County Public Utility District, which treats well water near Lake Stevens. The city government operated its own water treatment plant on the Pilchuck River near Granite Falls until 2017, when it was determined to be too costly to maintain.

Snohomish's wastewater system consists of a combined overflow for downtown and other older neighborhoods and a separated sewage and stormwater system for the rest of the city. A plan to replace the combined overflow system was approved in 2014 following interventions by the Washington State Department of Ecology. The city's wastewater treatment plant on the Snohomish River was upgraded, replacing an earlier proposal to send sewage to the City of Everett for treatment.

Health care

The city's nearest general hospital is EvergreenHealth Monroe, managed by a public hospital district that includes Snohomish and the Skykomish Valley. Until its affiliation with the EvergreenHealth system in 2015, it was known as the Valley General Hospital. Snohomish is home to several general and specialty clinics, including those managed by Providence Health & Services and The Everett Clinic.

References

External links

 

 
1859 establishments in Washington Territory
Cities in the Seattle metropolitan area
Cities in Snohomish County, Washington
Cities in Washington (state)
Former county seats in Washington (state)
Populated places established in 1859
Washington placenames of Native American origin